BR24live (until 30 June 2021: B5 plus) is a German public radio station owned and operated by the Bayerischer Rundfunk (BR).

References

Radio stations in Germany
Radio stations established in 2007
2007 establishments in Germany
Mass media in Munich
Bayerischer Rundfunk